Burt Kelly (October 6, 1898 – 1983) was an American film producer and writer. He was best known for Columbia Pictures' Blondie series. He founded KBS Productions Inc. in 1932, along with Sam Bischoff and William Saal.

Career 
Kelly was a former stock company manager who entered the film industry as a booking agent for the Paramount Publix theater chain. He later functioned as an executive with Educational Pictures, a purveyor of comedy two-reelers, and then Poverty Row’s Tiffany Pictures. In 1932, Kelly founded KBS Productions with Sam Bischoff and William Saal. The company thats name was derived from the initials of its three founders took over the former production facilities of Tiffany Pictures where they produced low budget Ken Maynard Westerns, and films such as The Death Kiss with Bela Lugosi, and Sherlock Holmes’ A Study in Scarlet. KBS (also known as Admiral Productions) lasted until late 1933, after which he joined Republic Pictures as an associate producer. In the early 1940s he joined Universal, producing his last movie Blondie's Secret in 1948.

Personal life 
He married actress Adrienne Dore in 1933.

Select filmography 
 1932 - Dynamite Ranch 
 1933 - The Death Kiss 
 1933 - Sherlock Holmes mystery A Study in Scarlet
 1938 - Swing Sister Swing
 1940 - Private Affair
 1940 - The Invisible Woman
 1941 - Hold That Ghost
 1944 - Strange Affair
 1946 - Blondie Knows Best
 1947 - The Swordsman
 1947 - Blondie's Big Moment
 1947 - Blondie's Holiday
 1948 - Blondie's Reward
 1948 - Blondie's Secret

References 

1898 births
1983 deaths
American film producers